was a junior college in Sapporo, Japan, and was

The institute was founded in 1950, The predecessor of the school, a training school for nursing, was founded in 1947. And the predecessor of the school, a training school for dietitian, was founded in 1949.

Educational institutions established in 1950
Japanese junior colleges
Educational institutions disestablished in 2002
1950 establishments in Japan
2002 disestablishments in Japan